Ibugos may refer to:

 Ivuhos Island, an island in the Batanes Islands archipel
 Unnamed volcano (Ibugos), an unnamed undersea volcano near the island